The Cooks Hill Rugby Club, known as the Brown Snakes, is located in Cooks Hill, New South Wales. The club has two teams in the Divisional competition of the Newcastle and Hunter Rugby Union. Club colours are brown and white. The club plays and trains at Empire park, with games played on Saturday afternoons. The Brown Snakes were established in 2007.

In 2016 the Brown Snakes won grand finals in both grades, for which they were presented the Presidents Cup and the Patrons Shield.

The values at the club focus on the social aspects of rugby. Preference is always given to enjoyment of the game rather than competitiveness. Notable elements of the season social calendar for the club include the preseason away trial, Ladies day, the Brown Snake Ball, Muswellbrook Bus Trip and Silly Sunday. The club is largely made up of players from country NSW, but also includes some originating from Newcastle, Sydney and abroad.

See also

References

2007 establishments in Australia
Rugby clubs established in 2007
Rugby union teams in New South Wales
Sport in Newcastle, New South Wales